Devčić is a surname.

It is among the most common surnames in the Lika-Senj County of Croatia.

Notable people with the surname include:

 Duško Devčić (born 1948), Croatian footballer
 Ivan Devčić (born 1948), Croatian Catholic archbishop
 Marina Devčić (born 1946), original name of Marina Dallas, Croatian-New Zealander singer
 Natko Devčić (1914–1997), Croatian composer

References

Croatian surnames